The Battle of St Fagans took place near the village of St Fagans in South Glamorgan on 8 May 1648 during the Second English Civil War. A detachment from the New Model Army defeated a Royalist force largely composed of mutinous former Parliamentarian soldiers. Victory largely ended significant Royalist resistance in Wales.

Background
Wales was regarded as a sensitive area by Parliament, since most of it had been Royalist during the First English Civil War. Their anxiety increased after the interception of messages from the Irish Confederacy offering support to Charles I. 

Royalist control of Cardiff and Milford Haven would potentially allow them to ship troops from Ireland to England. At the same time, the leaders of the New Model Army viewed the local commanders, John Poyer and Rowland Laugharne, as sympathetic to their opponents in Parliament, and thus unreliable. In July, Colonel Thomas Horton was sent with around 3,000 men to replace Laugharne, and secure these positions.

The revolt began in Pembrokeshire, an area that had been controlled by Parliament since early 1643. Like their New Model colleagues, the soldiers had not been paid for months, and feared being disbanded without their wages. In early March 1648, both Poyer, Governor of Pembroke Castle, and Rice Powell, who held Tenby Castle, refused to hand them over to officers of the New Model, and were supported by Laugharne.

What began as a dispute over pay turned political when the Parliamentarian mutineers made contact with Charles. Conversely, most former Royalists had been released after swearing not to bear arms against Parliament, and thus did not participate, one exception being Sir Nicholas Kemeys, who held Chepstow Castle for the king. By the end of April, Laugharne had assembled around 8,000 troops, and was marching on Cardiff.

Horton initially moved on Carmarthen, but then had to put down an uprising in Brecon, before occupying Cardiff and quartering his troops in and around St Fagans, west of the town. Learning that reinforcements led by Oliver Cromwell were on their way, Laugharne decided to attack Horton before they could arrive. Although Horton's 3,000 men were outnumbered, many of the 8,000 rebels were poorly trained and little match for experienced veterans.

The battle

A stream known as the Nant Dowlais separated the two armies. In the early morning, Laugharne sent 500 infantry across the stream to attack Horton's centre, hoping to take the Parliamentarians by surprise inside the village. This advance guard was routed by a charge by some of Horton's cavalry, and the Parliamentarians were able to deploy in the open.

The battle now became general in the open area to the north west of the village. In the centre, high hedges hampered Horton's horsemen, but Okey's dragoons forced both Royalist wings back. Eventually, Parliamentarian horse under Major Bethel were able to make a charge against the Royalist left and rear. The Royalists panicked and broke. Over 200 of Laugharne's men were killed and another 3,000 were taken prisoner.

The legend that the river Ely ran red with blood may be an exaggeration given the casualties, but the veteran parliamentarian advantage in horses meant they were able to repeatedly rout numerically superior numbers on the Royalist side.

Aftermath
Laugharne retreated with what was left of his army to join Poyer at Pembroke, while Horton besieged Rice Powell in Tenby Castle. Cromwell reached Gloucester on the day of the battle, then crossed into Wales shortly afterwards. Colonel Isaac Ewer and a small force were left to invest Chepstow Castle, while Cromwell joined Horton at Tenby on 15 May. Leaving Horton with enough men to deal with Powell, Cromwell marched the rest of the army to besiege Pembroke.

When these fortresses fell, Cromwell was able to march back into England to defeat an invading Scottish army at the decisive Battle of Preston. Cromwell had been considerably delayed dealing with Laugharne, but would have been even more so if Laugharne's field army had not been effectively destroyed at St Fagans.

References

Sources

Further reading

External links
Wales and the Civil War
St Fagans, Glamorganshire, 8 May 1648 

1648 in England
St Fagans 1648
St Fagans 1648
Conflicts in 1648
Wales in the English Civil War
1648 in Wales
St Fagans